Franklin Township is a township in Grundy County, in the U.S. state of Missouri.

Franklin Township was established in 1841, taking its name from Benjamin Franklin.

References

Townships in Missouri
Townships in Grundy County, Missouri